Sam Jamison (13 November 1905 – 14 December 1997) was a former Australian rules footballer who played with Richmond in the Victorian Football League (VFL).

Notes

External links 

1905 births
1997 deaths
Australian rules footballers from Victoria (Australia)
Richmond Football Club players